Miroslav Slepička (born 10 November 1981) is a Czech former professional mixed martial artist and professional football player who lastly played for 1. FK Příbram.

Football career  
He is a forward who wore the prized no. 10 shirt for Sparta Prague. He is also former Czech U-21 international who has previously played for Slovan Liberec, Marila Příbram, Milín, Marila Příbram, UD Příbram.

On 10 September 2008 Slepička debuted internationally in the match against the Northern Ireland in Belfast.

Career stats

References

External links
 
 
 Miroslav Slepička profile at Nogometni Magazin 
 

1981 births
Living people
Sportspeople from Příbram
Czech footballers
Czech expatriate footballers
Czech Republic youth international footballers
Czech Republic under-21 international footballers
Czech Republic international footballers
Association football forwards
1. FK Příbram players
FC Slovan Liberec players
AC Sparta Prague players
GNK Dinamo Zagreb players
SpVgg Greuther Fürth players
Czech First League players
Croatian Football League players
2. Bundesliga players
Indian Super League players
Expatriate footballers in Croatia
Czech expatriate sportspeople in Croatia
Expatriate footballers in Germany
Expatriate footballers in India
FC Goa players
Czech male mixed martial artists
FC Silon Táborsko players
Czech expatriate sportspeople in India